Lee Park may refer to:

Lee State Park, state park at Lee County, South Carolina, United States
Market Street Park, formerly Lee Park, a park at Charlottesville, Virginia, United States
Horn Park, Royal Borough of Greenwich, United Kingdom, also historically known as Lee Park

See also
Tom Lee Park